The 1976–77 Notre Dame Fighting Irish men's basketball team represented the University of Notre Dame during the 1976–77 NCAA men's basketball season.

Roster

Schedule

References

Notre Dame Fighting Irish men's basketball seasons
Notre Dame
Notre Dame
Notre Dame Fighting Irish
Notre Dame Fighting Irish